James Richard Perry (born March 4, 1950) is an American politician who served as the 14th United States secretary of energy from 2017 to 2019 and as the 47th governor of Texas from 2000 to 2015. Perry also ran unsuccessfully for the Republican nomination for President of the United States in the 2012 and 2016 elections, losing to Mitt Romney and Donald Trump, respectively.

Born into a family of cotton farmers in Haskell, Texas, Perry graduated from Texas A&M University in 1972 and entered into the United States Air Force, serving a five-year stint and achieving the rank of captain. After leaving the Air Force in 1977, Perry returned to Texas and entered politics, serving as a Democratic member of the Texas House of Representatives from 1985 to 1991. In 1989, Perry switched parties and became a Republican, and was elected Agriculture Commissioner of Texas the following year. In 1998, Perry was elected Lieutenant Governor of Texas, becoming the state's first Republican Lieutenant Governor since Reconstruction.

Perry assumed the governorship of Texas in December 2000, after Governor George W. Bush resigned following his election as President. Perry was re-elected Governor three times, becoming the longest-serving Governor in Texas history. As Governor, Perry identified as a staunch conservative, enacting conservative fiscal policies, restrictions on abortion and expanded gun rights. Long considered a potential presidential candidate, Perry officially announced his candidacy for the 2012 Republican nomination for President in August 2011. Perry initially performed well in polling and showed strong fundraising prowess, leading to him being considered a serious contender for the nomination. However, his support declined following poor performances in debates and early primaries, and he withdrew from the race in January 2012.

Perry declined to seek re-election to a fourth term as Governor and left office in 2015, launching a second presidential campaign shortly thereafter. Perry's second presidential campaign failed to garner substantial polling support, fundraising or media attention, leading him to withdraw from the race after only three months. Perry was initially a vocal opponent of Donald Trump's 2016 campaign for President, however, he later endorsed Trump after he secured the Republican nomination. After winning the presidency, Trump appointed Perry as Secretary of Energy, and he was confirmed by the United States Senate in a 62–37 vote on March 2, 2017. On October 17, 2019, Perry reported to Trump that he intended to resign as Secretary of Energy at the end of the year. He left office on December 1, 2019.

Early life
A fifth-generation Texan, Perry was born on March 4, 1950, in Haskell, Texas, and raised in Paint Creek, Texas, the son of dryland cotton farmers Joseph Ray Perry (1925-2017) and Amelia June Holt Perry (born 1929). He has one older sister. Perry's ancestry is almost entirely English, dating as far back as the original Thirteen Colonies. His family has been in Texas since before the Texas Revolution.

His father, a Democrat, was a long-time Haskell County commissioner and school board member. Perry has said that his interest in politics probably began in November 1961, when his father took him to the funeral of U.S. Representative Sam Rayburn.

Perry was in the Boy Scouts of America (BSA) and earned the rank of Eagle Scout. The BSA has honored Perry with the Distinguished Eagle Scout Award.

College
Perry attended Texas A&M University where he was a member of the Corps of Cadets and the Alpha Gamma Rho fraternity. He was elected senior class social secretary, a member and redpot in Aggie Bonfire, and one of A&M's five "yell leaders". He graduated in 1972 with a Bachelor of Science degree in animal science.

In 1989, he said, "I was probably a bit of a free spirit, not particularly structured real well for life outside of a military regime, I would have not lasted at Texas Tech or the University of Texas. I would have hit the fraternity scene and lasted about one semester."

First jobs
In the early 1970s, Perry interned during several summers with Southwestern Advantage, as a door-to-door book salesman. "I count my time working for Dortch Oldham [then president of the Southwestern family of companies] as one of the most important formative experiences of my life", Perry said in 2010. "There is nothing that tests your commitment to a goal like getting a few doors closed in your face." He said that "Mr. Oldham taught legions of young people to communicate quickly, clearly and with passion, a lesson that has served me well in my life since then."

Upon graduation from college in 1972, Perry was commissioned as an officer in the United States Air Force and completed pilot training in February 1974. He was then assigned as a Lockheed C-130 Hercules pilot with the 772nd Tactical Airlift Squadron at Dyess Air Force Base, located in Abilene, Texas. Perry's duties included two-month overseas rotations at RAF Mildenhall, located in Mildenhall, England, and Rhein-Main Air Base, located at Frankfurt am Main, Germany. His missions included a 1974 U.S. State Department drought relief effort in Mali, Mauritania and Chad, and, in 1976, earthquake relief in Guatemala. He left the Air Force in 1977 at the rank of captain, returned to Texas, and went into farming cotton with his father.

Early political career

Texas Legislature
In 1984, Perry was elected to the Texas House of Representatives as a Democrat from district 64, which included his home county of Haskell. He served on the House Appropriations and Calendars committees during his three two-year terms in office. He befriended fellow freshman state representative Lena Guerrero, a staunch liberal Democrat who endorsed Perry's reelection bid in 2006.

Perry was part of the "Pit Bulls", a group of Appropriations members who sat on the lower dais in the committee room ("the pit") who pushed for austere state budgets during the 1980s. At one point, The Dallas Morning News named him one of the ten most effective members of the legislature.

In 1987, Perry voted for a $5.7 billion tax increase proposed by Republican Governor Bill Clements. Perry supported Al Gore in the 1988 Democratic presidential primaries and worked for Gore's campaign in Texas. On September 29, 1989, Perry announced that he was switching parties, becoming a Republican. On a guest appearance on Fox show Hannity, he partially credits Reagan as part of the reason he became a Republican, also stating he switched political parties sooner in his life than Reagan.

Agriculture Commissioner
In 1990, as a newly minted Republican, Perry challenged Jim Hightower, the incumbent Democratic Agriculture Commissioner. Karl Rove was Perry's campaign manager.

In the Republican primary on March 13, 1990, Perry polled 276,558 votes (47%), with Richard McIver garnering 176,976 votes (30%) and Gene L. Duke, who placed third, polling 132,497 votes (23%). Since Perry fell shy of the necessary 50% to win outright, a runoff was held between Perry and McIver set on April 10, 1990. In the runoff, he emerged victorious, garnering 96,649 votes (69%) to McIver's 43,921 votes (31%).

During 1990, Hightower's office was embroiled in an FBI investigation into corruption and bribery. Three aides were convicted in 1993 of using public funds for political fundraising, although Hightower himself was not found to be involved in the wrongdoings. Perry narrowly defeated Hightower in November 1990, garnering 1,864,463 votes (49%) to Hightower's 1,820,145 votes (48%).

Rove raised $3 million to raise Perry's profile, "while tarnishing the name of Jim Hightower" resulting in Perry's name becoming a "household name in Texas—and Hightower's name synonymous with corruption".

As Agriculture Commissioner, Perry was responsible for promoting the sale of Texas farm produce to other states and foreign nations, and for supervising the calibration of weights and measures, such as gasoline pumps and grocery store scales.

In April 1993, Perry, while serving as Texas agriculture commissioner, expressed support for the effort to reform the nation's healthcare, describing it as "most commendable". The healthcare plan, first revealed in September, was ultimately unsuccessful due to Republican congressional opposition. In 2005, after being questioned on the issue by a potential opponent in the Republican governor primary, Perry said he expressed his support only in order to get Clinton to pay more attention to rural healthcare.

In 1994, Perry was reelected Agriculture Commissioner by a large margin, getting 2,546,287 votes (62 percent) to Democrat Marvin Gregory's 1,479,692 (36 percent). Libertarian Clyde L. Garland received the remaining 85,836 votes (2 percent). Gregory, a chicken farmer from Sulphur Springs, Texas, was on the Texas Agricultural Finance Authority with Perry in the early nineties as a Republican, but became a Democrat before running against Perry in 1994.

Lieutenant Governor
In 1998, Perry ran for lieutenant governor. During this election, Perry had a notable falling out with his previous top political strategist Karl Rove, which began the much-reported rivalry between the Bush and Perry camps. Perry polled 1,858,837 votes (50.04 percent) to the 1,790,106 (48.19 percent) cast for Democrat John Sharp. Perry became the state's first Republican lieutenant governor since Reconstruction, taking office on January 19, 1999.

Governor of Texas

Perry assumed the office of governor on December 21, 2000, following the resignation of George W. Bush—who was preparing to become President of the United States. He won the office in his own right in the 2002 gubernatorial election, where he received 58% of votes to Laredo oilman and businessman Tony Sanchez's 40%. He was re-elected in the 2006 gubernatorial election against three major opponents, polling 39% of votes against runner-up former U.S. Congressman Chris Bell of Houston with 30%. Former Republican Comptroller, Carole Keeton Strayhorn, running as an independent, garnered 18% of the vote and comic/author/musician, Kinky Friedman, also running as an independent, garnered over 12%. In the 2010 gubernatorial election, Perry became the first Texas governor to be elected to three four-year terms, polling 55% of votes to former Houston Mayor Bill White's 42%.

In the 2001 legislative session, Perry set a record for his use of the veto, rejecting 82 acts, more than any other governor in any single legislative session in the history of the state since Reconstruction.

In 2003, Perry formed the non-profit organization, the OneStar Foundation, designed to connect non-profits with resources and expertise to accomplish their missions and to promote volunteerism. He tapped the state Republican chairman Susan Weddington, who stepped down from that position after six years, as the president of OneStar. She left in 2009, and he chose Elizabeth Seale as her successor.

Perry is the fifth governor of Texas (after Coke Stevenson, Allan Shivers, Price Daniel, and John Connally) to have served more than two terms  and the only one to do so as a Republican. He is the longest-serving governor in Texas history and, at the time he left office, had held office longer than every other then-current U.S. governor except Terry Branstad of Iowa.

Fiscal policies
In his presidential campaign, Perry highlighted the economic success Texas achieved under his governorship. The efficacy of Perry's economic policies has been questioned by some sources.

A proclaimed proponent of fiscal conservatism, Perry often campaigned on job growth and tax issues, such as his opposition to creating a state income tax. In 2002, Perry refused to promise not to raise taxes as governor, and in the following years did propose or approve various tax and debt increases. In 2009, Perry signed Grover Norquist's pledge to "oppose and veto any and all efforts to increase taxes".

Texas began borrowing money in 2003 to pay for roads and was projected to owe $17.3 billion by the end of 2012, increasing total state debt from $13.4 billion in 2001 to $37.8 billion in 2011. The state's public finance authority sold $2 billion in bonds for unemployment benefits, and it was authorized to sell $1.5 billion more if necessary. Texas federal borrowing topped $1.6 billion in October 2010, before the bond sales.

In 2003, Perry signed legislation that created the Texas Enterprise Fund, which has since given $435 million in grants to businesses. The New York Times reported that many of the companies receiving grants, or their chief executives, have made contributions to Perry's campaigns or to the Republican Governors Association. (Perry became chairman of the group in 2008 and again in 2011.) Perry was criticized for supporting corporate tax breaks and other incentives, while the state government was experiencing budget deficits.

Healthcare

As governor, Perry was an opponent of federal health-care reform proposals and of the Patient Protection and Affordable Care Act, describing the latter as "socialism on American soil". His focus in Texas was on tort reform, signing a bill in 2003 that restricted non-economic damages in medical malpractice judgments. Perry touted this approach in his presidential campaign, although independent analysts have concluded that it has failed to increase the supply of physicians or limit health-care costs in Texas.

During Perry's governorship, Texas rose from second to first among states with the highest proportion of uninsured residents at 26%, and had the lowest level of access to prenatal care in the U.S. Perry and the state legislature cut Medicaid spending. The Los Angeles Times wrote that under Perry, "working Texans increasingly have been priced out of private healthcare while the state's safety net has withered."

Perry's office said that Texas represents a model private-sector approach to health-care. His spokeswoman said, "Texas does provide an adequate safety net to those truly in need... and many individuals simply choose not to purchase healthcare coverage."

Perry is anti-abortion and has signed bills with rules or restrictions for abortion procedures and funding for them.

In December 2011, Perry said he had undergone a "transformation" and now opposed abortions, even in cases of rape and incest. The next day he clarified that he would allow an exception for abortions that would save a mother's life.

In February 2007, Perry issued an executive order mandating that Texas girls receive the HPV vaccine, which protects against some strains of the human papilloma virus, a contributing factor to some forms of cervical cancer. Following the move, news outlets reported various apparent financial connections between Perry and the vaccine's manufacturer, Merck. Merck's political action committee has contributed $28,500 since 2001 to Perry's campaigns. Perry later reverses himself, calling the vaccine mandate a "mistake". In May 2007, the Texas Legislature passed a bill undoing the order; Perry did not veto the bill, saying the veto would have been overruled, but blamed lawmakers who supported the bill for the deaths of future Texan cervical cancer victims.

On July 1, 2011, Perry both had adult stem cell surgery in Houston and started "laying the groundwork" for the commercialization of the adult stem cell industry in Texas.

Religion

Perry grew up in the United Methodist Church. He and his family were members of Tarrytown United Methodist Church in Austin until 2010, when they began attending Lake Hills Church, a non-denominational evangelical megachurch in western Travis County. Perry told the Austin American-Statesman that he began attending Lake Hills because it was close to the rental home where he and his wife lived while the Governor's Mansion was being renovated.

In 2006, Perry said he believed in the inerrancy of the Bible and that those who do not accept Jesus as their Savior will go to hell. A couple of days later, he clarified, "I don't know that there's any human being that has the ability to interpret what God and his final decision-making is going to be."

In his 2008 book On My Honor, Perry expressed his views on the Establishment Clause and the Free Exercise Clause of the U.S. Constitution. "Let's be clear: I don't believe government, which taxes people regardless of their faith, should espouse a specific faith. I also don't think we should allow a small minority of atheists to sanitize our civil dialogue of religious references."

In June 2011, Perry proclaimed August 6 as a Day of Prayer and Fasting, inviting other governors to join him in a prayer meeting hosted by the American Family Association in Houston. The event was criticized as going beyond prayer and fasting to include launching Perry's presidential campaign.

Perry has called himself "a firm believer in intelligent design as a matter of faith and intellect", and has expressed support for its teaching alongside evolution in Texas schools, but has also said that "educators and local school officials, not the governor, should determine science curriculum".

Education
In 2005, Perry said he would not "approve an education budget that shortchanges teacher salary increases, textbooks, education technology, and education reforms. And I cannot let $2 billion sit in some bank account when it can go directly to the classroom".

Following a second rejection of Perry's bill, Perry asked John Sharp to head a task force charged with preparing a bipartisan education plan, which was subsequently adopted.

In 2001, Perry expressed his pride in the enactment of the statute extending in-state tuition to undocumented immigrants who meet Texas' residency requirements. It also required the undocumented students to pledge to apply for permanent residency or citizenship if this became a possibility for them. In September 2014, Gov. Perry stated during a debate his continuous support for the program.

LGBT rights

Perry is a firm opponent of LGBT rights and as both Governor of Texas and Secretary of Energy became controversial for his homophobic comments and anti-LGBT positions.

In 2002, Perry described the Texas same-sex anti-sodomy law as "appropriate". The following year, the U.S. Supreme Court struck down the statute in Lawrence v. Texas, determining that it violated the Fourteenth Amendment to the Constitution.

In his 2010 book, Perry referenced the Lawrence decision, writing "Texans have a different view of the world than do the nine oligarchs in robes." In 2011, Perry admitted that he did not know about the Lawrence decision; when told that the Supreme Court case had struck down Texas's anti-sodomy law, Perry said: "I'm not taking the bar exam [...]I don't know what a lot of legal cases [...] My position on traditional marriage is clear [...] I don't need a federal law case to explain it to me."

Perry supported Texas Proposition 2 in 2005, a ballot proposition that amended the Texas constitution by defining marriage as "only a union between a man and a woman" and prohibiting the state from creating or recognizing "any legal status identical or similar to marriage" (such as civil unions).

In 2011, after New York legalized same-sex marriage, Perry said it was their right to do so under the principle of states' rights in the Tenth Amendment. A spokesman later reiterated Perry's support for a federal constitutional amendment banning same-sex marriage, saying that position was not inconsistent, since an amendment would require ratification by three-fourths of the states.

After the U.S. Supreme Court ruled in Obergefell v. Hodges in 2015 that the fundamental right to marry is guaranteed to same-sex couples by the Constitution, Perry condemned the decision, saying: "I'm a firm believer in traditional marriage, and I also believe the 10th Amendment leaves it to each state to decide this issue."

In his first book, On My Honor, published in 2008, Perry compared homosexuality to alcoholism, writing that he is "no expert on the 'nature versus nurture' debate" but gays should simply choose abstinence. Perry's comments created immense controversy and drew ire from several LGBT rights groups.

During the 2012 presidential campaign, he criticized the repeal of the "don't ask, don't tell" policy for the U.S. military. In a 2011 campaign ad, he stated: "there's something wrong in this country when gays can serve openly in the military" and later defended the ad, saying he was "very comfortable" with it. Perry said using foreign aid as a policy tool against foreign countries that violate the human rights of homosexuals was "not in America's interests" and was part of a "war on traditional American values".

Perry, an Eagle Scout, has called on the Boy Scouts to continue their ban on homosexuality and blamed America for not living up to the ideals of the Scouts.

In July 2017, Perry strongly expressed his support for Donald Trump's ban on transgender people from serving in the U.S. military stating that "The idea that the American people need to be paying for these types of operations to change your sex is not very wise from a standpoint of economics."

Crime
Perry's campaigns for lieutenant governor and governor focused on a tough stance on crime. He has supported block grants for crime programs.

Jeff L. Blackburn, chief counsel of the Innocence Project of Texas, said of Perry that "He has done more good than any other governor we've ever had [...] unless, of course, it involves the death penalty. On the death penalty, Rick Perry has a profound mental block."

In 2007, Perry signed a law ending automatic arrest for cannabis possession.

Death penalty

Perry supports the death penalty. In June 2001, he vetoed a ban on the execution of mentally retarded inmates. In 2011, during a televised debate for presidential candidates, he said he had "never struggled" with the question of the possible innocence of any of the 234 inmates executed to date while he was governor.

Cases in which Perry has been criticized for his lack of intervention include those of Cameron Todd Willingham and Mexican nationals José Medellín and Humberto Leal Garcia.

Perry commuted the death sentence of Kenneth Foster, who was convicted of murder despite evidence that he was only present at the scene of the crime. Foster was convicted under a Texas law that makes co-conspirators liable in certain cases of homicide. In this case, it tied Foster to the triggerman. Perry raised doubts about the law and urged the legislature to re-examine the issue. "I believe the right and just decision is to commute Foster's sentence from the death penalty to life imprisonment," Perry said.

Perry also refused to grant a stay of execution in 2004 in the case of Cameron Todd Willingham, even though an investigation by the Texas Forensic Science Commission determined parts of the original investigation may not have looked at all of the evidence correctly. Perry said in 2009 that "Willingham was a monster. He was a guy who murdered his three children, who tried to beat his wife into an abortion so that he wouldn't have those kids. Person after person has stood up and testified to facts of this case that quite frankly you all aren't covering" and later replaced the chairman and other members of the Science Commission prior to a meeting on the case.  The replacements were believed to potentially related to the election slated for the following year.

Infrastructure
In 2002, Perry proposed the Trans-Texas Corridor (TTC), a $175 billion transportation network that would include a 4,000-mile network of highways, rail, and utility lines and would be funded by private investors. Plans for the project were dropped in 2009 in favor of more incremental road projects.  Opposition to the project, also called the "NAFTA super highway" garnered opposition from rural Texans, labor and environmentalists, the project became a major issue in the 2006 gubernatorial campaign.

Gun ownership
Perry has an A+ rating from the National Rifle Association. He possesses a Concealed Carry License (CCL) and has signed a number of bills that increased CCL access.

Mexico border
In 2005, Perry launched Operation Linebacker, which was intended to prevent terrorists from exploiting the Texas-Mexico border. There was no evidence that terrorists attempted to exploit the border. Perry touted the border security efforts as he campaigned for re-election. During Perry's governorship, he launched additional operations and persuaded the Texas legislature to devote more taxpayers resources to border security. According to a 2022 investigative report by the Texas Tribune, "The way the governors and their administrations have tracked success has fluctuated over the years, offering little clarity into whether the state is closer to securing the border today than it was nearly 20 years ago. Neither the governor’s office nor the DPS, the main agency leading border security efforts, can provide a full breakdown of the state-led operations since 2005, their duration, their cost to taxpayers and their accomplishments."

During a large surge in illegal immigration through the U.S. southern border in the summer of 2014, Perry criticized U.S. President Barack Obama, saying the surge was "a humanitarian crisis that he has the ability to stop". On July 21, 2014, Perry announced he would send in 1,000 National Guard troops to secure the border. Although illegal immigration levels declined over 70% after Perry deployed the National Guard, PolitiFact.com rated his claim that the decline resulted from the surge as "mostly false".

In 2016, The Texas Tribune wrote that "Perry has long been a critic of building a wall or fence along the border." After Trump won the Republican presidential nomination in 2016, Perry fully embraced Trump's proposed border wall.

Veto controversy and exoneration

On August 15, 2014, Perry was indicted by a Travis County grand jury. The first charge of the indictment was abuse of official capacity, which has since been ruled unconstitutional, for threatening to veto $7.5 million in funding for the Public Integrity Unit, a state public corruption prosecutors department. The second charge, which has also since been ruled unconstitutional, was coercion of a public servant, for seeking the resignation of Travis County District Attorney Rosemary Lehmberg, a Democrat, after she was convicted of drunk driving and incarcerated.

Perry pleaded not guilty to both charges. Perry's supporters called the charges political and partisan, and several Democratic commentators, including David Axelrod, believed charges were weak.

In February 2016, Perry was cleared of all charges.

The Texas Court of Criminal Appeals ruled that courts could not limit veto power and that prosecuting Perry over his action violates "the separation of powers provision of the Texas Constitution" and infringed on Perry's First Amendment right to freedom of speech.

Retirement as governor

By the end of his third full term, he had served more than 14 consecutive years in office. A University of Texas at Austin–Texas Tribune poll released in June 2013, showed Perry leading potential primary challenger Attorney General Greg Abbott by double digits, 45–19%. In February, the same poll had Perry leading by a 3-to-1 margin (49–17%) of 32 points over Abbott.

However, Perry decided not to run for re-election to a fourth full term, announcing in front of family and supporters at the Holt Cat headquarters in San Antonio on July 8, 2013, that he would retire instead.

Perry retired with the 10th longest gubernatorial tenure in United States history at the end of his term on January 20, 2015, at  days as well as the record of the longest serving Texas Governor.

2012 presidential campaign

Perry was considered as a potential candidate since as early as the 2008 presidential election, initially denying he was interested in the office but later becoming more open-minded. He formally launched his campaign on August 13, 2011, in Charleston, South Carolina.

While he was initially successful in fundraising and was briefly considered a serious contender for the nomination, he struggled during the debates and his poll numbers began to decline. After finishing fifth with just over 10% of the vote in the Iowa caucuses on January 3, 2012, Perry considered dropping out of the presidential race but did not. After a poor showing in New Hampshire and with "lagging" poll numbers in South Carolina, Perry formally announced he was suspending his campaign on January 19, 2012.

2016 presidential campaign

Almost immediately following the 2012 election, Perry was mentioned as a potential candidate for the presidency in the 2016 presidential election, with a Time magazine article in July 2013 saying that "everything is aligned for Rick Perry to be the Republican nominee for president in 2016."

Perry officially launched his 2016 presidential candidacy on June 4, 2015, in Addison, Texas. A version of the Colt Ford song "Answer To No One" boomed from loudspeakers, as Perry took to the stage. He then announced his candidacy at the scheduled press conference.

Perry withdrew on September 11, 2015—becoming the first in the field of major candidates to drop out—following poor polling after the first debate. In the weeks before he dropped out of the race, Perry's campaign was in dire financial straits, spending nearly four times as much as it raised.

On January 25, 2016, Perry endorsed United States Senator Ted Cruz (R-TX) for president. On May 5, 2016, following the suspension of Cruz's presidential campaign, Perry endorsed Donald Trump for the presidency.

Secretary of Energy

On December 12, 2016, multiple sources reported that President-elect Trump would nominate Perry to serve as Secretary of Energy. On December 14, 2016, it was officially announced that Perry would be nominated as Secretary of Energy by President-elect Trump. The nomination initially faced heavy criticism as Perry had called for the Department of Energy to be abolished during his 2012 presidential campaign and had been unable to remember the name of the department during a Presidential debate. His nomination was approved by a 16–7 vote from the United States Senate Committee on Energy and Natural Resources on January 31, 2017.

On March 2, 2017, the United States Senate voted 62–37 to confirm Perry. The next month, Perry ordered a study of the U.S. electric grid with particular consideration to coal power.

In a CNBC interview on June 19, 2017, when asked about the role of human activity in the recent rise of the Earth's temperature, Perry said, "The fact is this shouldn’t be a debate about, ‘Is the climate changing, is man having an effect on it?’ Yeah, we are. The question should be just how much, and what are the policy changes that we need to make to effect that?"

In November 2017, Perry suggested that using fossil fuels to light dangerous places in Africa could reduce sexual assault, saying, "When the lights are on, when you have light that shines the righteousness, if you will, on those types of acts." Perry was criticized by the Sierra Club for "exploiting the struggle of those most affected by climate change".

For one week in November 2018, it was reported that the U.S. had become a net exporter of oil, temporarily ending nearly 75 continuous years of dependence on foreign oil.

On October 4, 2019, the New York Times reported that he was expected to resign as Secretary of Energy by the end of 2019, based on information from anonymous sources. On October 17, 2019, Perry told Trump he would resign by the end of the year, ultimately departing at the beginning of December.

Trump–Ukraine scandal

A little more than a month after Perry attended Zelenskiy's May 2019 inauguration, Ukraine awarded the contract to Perry's supporters after Perry recommended one to be Zelensky's energy adviser. The recommendation was made as Zelensky was attempting to secure the nearly $400 million in U.S. military aid.  A week after Perry attended the inauguration, "Ukrainian Energy", a new joint venture between Michael Bleyzer's investment firm SigmaBleyzer and Alex Cranberg's Aspect Energy, submitted a bid for a 50-year drilling contract at a Ukraine government-controlled site called Varvynska.

A July 25, 2019 telephone call between Trump and Ukraine president Volodymyr Zelensky led in September to a whistleblower complaint and an impeachment inquiry against Trump. Two weeks after the inquiry was launched, Trump claimed in a conference call with Congressional Republican leaders that he had only made the telephone call at Perry's urging. Perry's spokesperson said that Perry had suggested Trump discuss energy security with Zelensky, but energy was not mentioned in the publicly released memo about the conversations, which instead focused on Trump asking Zelensky to launch investigations into Joe Biden, Hunter Biden, Crowdstrike, and the 2016 U.S. presidential election. Per Trump's direction earlier that year, Perry spoke with Rudy Giuliani about Ukraine, which Mick Mulvaney confirmed. Perry denied ever mentioning the Bidens in his discussions with Trump or Ukrainian officials. Mulvaney had put Gordon Sondland, Kurt Volker, and Perry in charge of managing the Ukraine–United States relations instead of diplomats at the National Security Council and the US Department of State.

Perry was mentioned in October 2019 by former U.S. officials in relation to reports he planned to have Amos Hochstein replaced as a member of the board at Naftogaz with someone aligned with Republican interests. Perry denied the reports. In November 2019, both Sondland and David Holmes, who serves as counselor of political affairs at the U.S Embassy in Ukraine, testified that Perry had played a senior role in the Ukraine campaign, with Holmes even describing Perry, along with Sondland and Volker, was one of the "Three Amigos" who directly assisted both Trump and Giuliani.

Career outside politics
In February 2015, Perry announced that he would join the board of directors of Energy Transfer Partners, which owns and operates one of the largest energy asset portfolios in the United States, and Sunoco Partners, another major Dallas energy company. According to SEC filings, Perry resigned from the boards of both companies on December 31, 2016. In early January 2020, Perry joined the board of LE GP, general partner of Energy Transfer. In February 2020, Perry rejoined MCNA Dental's board of directors as chief strategy officer and vice chairman.

Dancing with the Stars
On August 30, 2016, Perry was announced as one of the celebrities who would compete on season 23 of Dancing with the Stars. He was partnered with professional dancer Emma Slater. Perry and Slater were eliminated on the third week of competition and finished in 12th place out of 13 competitors.

Bibliography
 On My Honor: Why the American Values of the Boy Scouts are Worth Fighting For (2008)
 Fed Up! Our Fight to Save America from Washington (2010)

Personal life
In 1982, Perry married Mary Anita Thigpen, his childhood sweetheart whom he had known since elementary school. They have two adult children, Griffin and Sydney. Anita attended West Texas State University and earned a degree in nursing. She has spearheaded a number of health-related initiatives such as the Anita Thigpen Perry Endowment at the University of Texas Health Science Center at San Antonio, which focuses on nutrition, cardiovascular disease, health education, and early childhood development. She helped develop and host the Texas Conference for Women.

Perry played himself in minor roles for several feature films, including Man of the House, Deep in the Heart, and Hating Breitbart.

In 2001, the American Cowboy Culture Association, based in Lubbock, handed Perry its "The Top Cowboy of Texas" award. In accepting the honor, Perry cited the importance of his father, Ray Perry, and a former neighbor in Haskell County, the late Watt R. Matthews (born 1899), who Perry said taught him "not only about Texas and [its] history [...] but also about the importance of the values that we learned growing up in a rural environment".

Perry is a member of the National Society of the Sons of the American Revolution and was awarded its Gold Good Citizenship Medal.

Electoral history

See also
 Republican Party presidential candidates, 2016
 List of American politicians who switched parties in office
 Political positions of Rick Perry

References

External links

 Secretary of Energy Rick Perry
 2014 felony grand jury indictment
 
 The Perry Trap at The Austin Chronicle
 Collected news and commentary at The Economist
 Collected news and commentary at Fox News
 Collected news and commentary at the Houston Chronicle
 Collected news and commentary at the Texas Monthly
 Collected news and commentary at The Texas Observer
 Collected news and commentary at The Texas Tribune
 The Perry Watch at The Dallas Morning News
 

|-

|-

|-

|-

 
|-

|-

|-

|-

 
1950 births
Living people
21st-century American male writers
21st-century American politicians
21st-century evangelicals
Agriculture commissioners of Texas
American evangelicals
American people of English descent
Candidates in the 2012 United States presidential election
Candidates in the 2016 United States presidential election
Christians from Texas
Conservatism in the United States
Farmers from Texas
Governors of Texas
Lieutenant Governors of Texas
Members of the Texas House of Representatives
People from Haskell County, Texas
People from Haskell, Texas
Republican Party governors of Texas
Texas A&M University alumni
Texas Democrats
Texas Republicans
Trump administration cabinet members
United States Air Force officers
United States Secretaries of Energy